Phoenix Deer Valley Airport  is a public airport  north of Phoenix, in Maricopa County, Arizona, United States. It is owned by the City of Phoenix. The FAA's National Plan of Integrated Airport Systems for 2009–2013 categorized it as a reliever airport for Phoenix Sky Harbor International Airport.

In 2020 the airport recorded 402,444 aircraft movements, making it the 5th busiest airport in the world by aircraft movements and the busiest general aviation airport in the world. The airport's high ranking is attributed to its large general aviation business and its status as the home of two popular flight schools.

History
In the 1950s, the Sperry Flight Systems Company established an aerospace/defense manufacturing facility on land north of Phoenix's city limits in what was mostly undeveloped desert. While the plant was under construction, roughly 480 acres to the north nearby was also leased as the potential site for a new flight testing facility. Later on this land was developed into a private airport and then sold, in 1971, to the City of Phoenix. A number of flight research and general aviation firms soon made the new airport their base of operations. Federal Aviation Administration funding enabled upgrades to the terminal building, flight control tower, runways, and many other facilities and safety features.

Usage
There is no scheduled airline service, but charter service is available through several companies.

Facilities and aircraft
It has two asphalt runways: 7R/25L is 8,196 by 100 feet (2,498 x 30 m) and 7L/25R is 4,500 by 75 feet (1,372 x 23 m).

In 2020 the airport had 402,444 aircraft operations, average 1,102 per day: 99% general aviation, <1% military, 1% air taxi, and <1% airline. 920 aircraft were then based at the airport: 773 single-engine, 93 multi-engine, 22 jet, 18 helicopter, 10 glider, 2 ultralight, and 2 military.

In popular culture
Several scenes of the 1980 aerobatics movie Cloud Dancer were filmed at this airport.

Incidents and accidents
On August 20, 2018, an accident occurred when an Acroduster airplane crashed at Seventh Street near the airport as it was trying to land on it, killing 54-year-old pilot Theodore Rich and his 49-year-old passenger, Elaine Carpenter.

Gallery
Phoenix Deer Valley Airport has hosted various air shows of vintage World War II aircraft. Among the events which have taken place is "Wings of Freedom".

References

External links
 Phoenix Deer Valley Airport, official site
 Phoenix Deer Valley Airport at Arizona DOT website
 
 

Airports in Maricopa County, Arizona
Airports established in 1960
1960 establishments in Arizona